Kotipalli also known as Koti Theertham is a village located in K. Gangavaram mandal of Ramachandrapuram revenue division in Konaseema district of Andhra Pradesh, India. The temple town is also known as Kumararama of the Pancharama Kshetras, and is located 15 km from Amalapuram. Every year festivals such as Maha Sivaratri, Vaisakha Suddha Ekadasi, Aswayuja Suddha Padyami to Dwadasi and Ksheerabdi Dwadasi Teppotsavam are celebrated in this village.

Lord Siva is worshiped here as Someswaraswamy and Koteswaraswamy along with his consort Parvati as Rajarajeswari Devi. Kotipalli is located on banks of the river Gautami-Godavari, one of the two branches of the river Godavari. Godavari splits into two branches - Vriddha Gautami (Gautami Godavari) and Vasishta Godavari. Again the Gautami branch splits into two branches namely Gautami and Nilarevu. Vengi kings of Eastern Chalukyas, who ruled this region between 7th and 12th centuries C.E. built this temple and the pond called as SomaGundam or Soma Pushkarini during their rule. In the inner sanctum one can see a Chaya Someswara Swamy's Shiva Lingam along with the idol of Annapurna. The main Shiva Linga of Chaya Someswara was installed by Lord Chandra who lost his glow (chaya). There is a separate shrine for Goddess Rajarajeswari. To regain his former radiance Chandra was told by Vishnu to install Shiva Linga along with Raja Rajeswari and worship them. Just beside the main shrine there is the shrine of Siddhi Janardana Swamy flanked by Sri devi and Bhu Devi on either sides. He is the guardian or Kshetrapalaka of this temple. Siddhi Janardana Swamy was installed by Kasyapa Maharshi at the holy place where Lord Vishnu did penance after sending down Bali to patala (lower world) to save gods. Beautifully carved 8' Nandi Bull and 6' Garukmantha can be seen seated right in front of the DwajaSthambha. This place is graced by both Shiva and Vishnu showing the unity of both these gods. On one side of temple one can see Lord Koteswara, a Shiva Lingam submerged in water (Jala Lingam) - installed by Lord Indra as a penance to the curse given by Gouthama Muni,  In the northern mandapa one can see the shrine of Kalabhairava and Nava-graha temple with Mrithyunjaya Lingam and His consort Uma. A little further there is Sankaracharya mandiram with Chandramouleeswara Lingam. It is said that Sri Sankaracharya visited this temple once. This place is named as Kotipalii since the worship done here will give merit equal to that of one crore times done elsewhere.

Historically, Kotipalli has been a great seat of Hindu learning and philosophy. One of the Acharya's of Dwaadasaradhyas from the Srouta Saiva Siddhanta philosophy, Kotipalli Viswaaradhya (Kashyapa Gotram) was born to Someswara and Bhavani in 12th century AD at Kotipalli. He authored such great books as Chaturvedasaram, Vrushabhadhipa Satakam and Basavarajeeyam and propagated Saiva Dharmas. He is also stated to have stayed at Pamidimukkala and then in Palkurki village and hence known as Palakurti Viswaradhya.

Kotipalli is one of the three important ferry points for Kotipalli-Mukteswaram and the other two being Bodasakurru-Pasarlapudi and Sakhinetipalli-Narasapuram in the Konaseema region.

References

Villages in Konaseema district
Shiva temples in Andhra Pradesh
Konaseema district